Peter "Sugarfoot" Cunningham (born March 25, 1963) is a retired Canadian 7-time World Champion Hall of Fame kickboxer, boxer, martial artist, actor and author. Rated by experts as one of the greatest full contact fighters of all time, Sugarfoot was a superb technician who possessed high fighting I.Q. and lightning speed. He retired from kickboxing in 1996 with a record of 50-1-1, having avenged the only draw of his career but only one defeated Peter, the undefeated Richard Sylla at the WKA World Title in Paris. Cunningham's skills in the ring have been praised by many martial arts legends, including Benny "The Jet" Urquidez, Bill "Superfoot" Wallace, Chuck Norris, Dan Inosanto, Rigan Machado, Don "The Dragon" Wilson and many others.  Cunningham maintained a high level competition throughout his career as most of his opponents were either current or former champions. In 1998 in San Jose, California, Peter was honored as the inaugural inductee in the I.S.K.A. Hall of Fame.

Cunningham's nickname "Sugarfoot" is a combination of the names of two great fighters in boxing and kickboxing that his style most resembled, "Sugar" Ray Leonard and Bill "Superfoot" Wallace, and it was given to him by his peers at his first dojo in Edmonton, Canada while he was still a teenager.

Peter's World Titles included the W.K.A (World Karate Association) Lightweight, Super Lightweight and Junior Walterweight World Titles, the K.I.C.K. (Karate International Council of Kickboxing) Super Lightweight Title, the I.M.F. (International Muay Thai Federation) Junior Welterweight Title, and the I.S.K.A. (International Sport Karate Association) Light Welterweight World Title.

Sugarfoot is also an actor and has appeared in TV series such as Kung Fu: The Legend Continues and CSI, and in movies such as No Retreat, No Surrender (1986) and The Fighter (2010).

Biography and career

Early life
Peter D.O. Cunningham was born in Port of Spain, Trinidad and Tobago on March 25, 1963.  When he was six years old, his parents divorced, and his mother Rosel left Trinidad and Tobago together with him and his siblings, and moved to the small island of St. Vincent in the West Indies. This is where Peter watched Enter the Dragon for the first time as a 10-year old and decided that he is "going to be like Bruce Lee". In 1976, Peter's family moved yet again, this time to Edmonton, Alberta, Canada, to start a new life.  His mother became a sole bread winner and took care of the children.  Peter attended St. Marks Junior High School and St. Joseph's High School in Edmonton.

Introduction to martial arts
Peter took his first karate class in February 1978 after being introduced to his first karate dojo and first Sensei Grandmaster Robert Supeene Sr. by junior high school friends. He immediately felt the connection with his Sensei and fell in love with the sport. Seven months later, as an orange belt holder Peter participated in his first karate tournament.  Along with winning top prize in his own belt division, he was voted "Best Technician" of the tournament, an award typically only won by black belts. This tournament marked the beginning of his career.

Fighting career

Peter started his amateur kickboxing career in 1980, when he beat Reg Johnson in Calgary, Canada. Later that month, he began taking boxing lessons with Ted James and his son Rocky at the South Side Legion boxing gym in Edmonton.

A few more wins in amateur kickboxing followed, and in January 1981, Peter met the legendary Benny "The Jet" Urquidez, who was giving a kickboxing seminar in Vancouver, British Columbia, Canada. This is where The Jet told the young fighter "you are going to be a great champion".  Around this time, Peter "Sugarfoot" Cunningham had his first professional kickboxing fight where he took on the Canadian Champion Gordy Gong. Peter won by a big knock out, a round kick to the head. After the fight, Sensei Rueben Urquidez and Sensei Blinky Rodriguez approached Cunningham and his mother to congratulate him on the big win, and extend an invitation to come and train out of their world class facility in Van Nuys, California, The Jet Center. This was a dream come true for Peter and he gladly accepted.

As Sugarfoot made his move to Los Angeles, he was featured on the undercard of Muhammad Ali's exhibition bout with Edmonton Oiler enforcer Dave Semenko. The event took place at Northlands Coliseum in Edmonton on June 12, 1983. Peter defeated his opponent, who was a World Lightweight Champion, and impressed Ali's trainer and cornerman Bundini Brown, who introduced Sugarfoot to Ali and his family. Ali signed a book for Peter's mother, and then suggested to Bundini to invite the young fighter to come and train at the Joe Lewis - Muhammad Ali Gym in Santa Monica.

It seems that it was destiny and that the stars aligned - two of the greatest champions in their respective sports, boxing and kickboxing - both extended invitations to join them and train with them to pursue his championship aspirations. From that point on, and for the next three years Peter trained at both gyms every day, at the Joe Lewis - Muhammad Ali Gym in the morning and at the Jet Center in the afternoon. At this time, Sugarfoot was fighting professionally in both boxing and kickboxing.  He began to gravitate towards kickboxing, and in 1986 after losing a controversial boxing lightweight title fight, decided to focus solely on kickboxing.

Acting
Peter is also an actor with several movies to his credit. In his first role, Cunningham played the lightweight champion fighter Frank Peters and faced off with action star Jean-Claude Van Damme in the 1985 martial arts film No Retreat, No Surrender. He was also featured in the 1986 Yuen Biao/Corey Yuen film Righting Wrongs. In addition, Peter guest starred opposite David Carradine on the Kung Fu: The Legend Continues television series (1993) and worked on big budget feature I Spy (2002), where he doubled Eddie Murphy. Most recently, Peter was in The Fighter (2010), playing the role of Mike 'Machine Gun' Mungin.

Trainer
After retiring from competition, Peter continued his career in martial arts as a successful trainer. He has and is continuing to train top professional fighters, amateur fighters, as well as teaching classes for general public, including kids and adults. Over the years, he has trained many World Champion amateur and professional fighters in boxing and kickboxing, as well as well-known celebrities.  In 2014, Cunningham was invited to be one of the coaches of the USA Kickboxing Team, and he brought his star pupil German Baltazar along with him. Together, they have led the team to gold medals in several international tournaments and events, including the 2014 Irish Kickboxing Open, 2014 WAKO (World Association of Kickboxing Organizations) tournament in Canada, 2014 Brazilian Kickboxing World Cup and a history-making USA vs. Cuba tournament in Havana, Cuba in 2015. In 2018 he was teaching at House Of Champions in California.

Other
Peter grew up with siblings Julie, Zoey, Natalie, Vertille, Bert and Patrick. His son Chazz Christian Cunningham was born in 1998. As of 2016, Sugarfoot trains fighters and teaches classes at Team Karate Centers in Woodland Hills.
Cunningham has written two books, the first of which, a kickboxing training manual entitled Civilized Warring, was published in 1995.  He co-authored his second book, "Testimonials of a Legendary Champion" in 2013.

Championships and accomplishments

Boxing
 Edmonton Golden Gloves – Gold Medal – 1981
 Canadian Games – Bronze Medal – 1981
 #1 ranked Lightweight boxer in Canada – 1986

Kickboxing and Muay Thai
World Kickboxing Association
 WKA Kickboxing World Lightweight Champion
 1986 WKA Kickboxing World Super Lightweight Champion
 1993 WKA Kickboxing World light welterweight Champion
Karate International Council of Kickboxing
 K.I.C.K. Super Lightweight Intercontinental  Champion
International Muay Thai Federation
 1988 IMF World Junior Welterweight Champion
World Martial Arts Challenge
 W.M.A.C. Junior Welterweight World Champion
International Sport Kickboxing Association
 1992 ISKA. Oriental Rules World Light Welterweight Champion (2 defenses)
 1998 ISKA inaugural Hall of Fame inductee

Fight record

|-  style="background:#cfc;"
| 1996-06-01 || Win ||align=left| Dida Diafat ||  || Paris, France || Decision || 12 || 2:00 
|-
! style=background:white colspan=9 |

|-  style="background:#cfc;"
| 1993-12-04 || Win ||align=left| Ronnie Green || W.K.A. Event at Mirage Hotel || Las Vegas, Nevada, USA || Decision (unanimous) || 12 || 2:00  
|-
! style=background:white colspan=9 |

|-  style="background:#c5d2ea;"
| 1992-11-21 || Draw||align=left| Dida Diafat || ISKA Kickboxing || Paris, France || Decision || 12 || 2:00 
|-
! style=background:white colspan=9 |

|-  style="background:#cfc;"
| 1992-03-16 || Win ||align=left| Chris Anderson || World Martial Arts Challenge || Las Vegas, Nevada, United States || TKO (corner stoppage/low kicks) || 7 || 
|-
! style=background:white colspan=9 |

|-  style="background:#cfc;"
| 1990-07-07 || Win ||align=left| Lafayette Lawson  || K.I.C.K. event at Caesars Palace || Las Vegas, Nevada, United States || Decision (unanimous)|| 12 || 2:00  
|-
! style=background:white colspan=9 |

|-  style="background:#cfc;"
| 1990-06-16|| Win ||align=left| Sagat Petchyindee|| || Sydney, Australia || Decision (unanimous) || 11 ||2:00 
|-
! style=background:white colspan=9 |

|-  style="background:#cfc;"
| 1989-1990 || Win ||align=left| Juan Torres ||  || Hollywood, California, United States || Decision (unanimous)|| 11 || 2:00 
|-
! style=background:white colspan=9 |

|-  style="background:#cfc;"
| 1989-07-31 || Win ||align=left| Asuka Nobuya || || Hollywood, California, United States || Decision (unanimous) || 11 || 2:00
|-
! style=background:white colspan=9 |

|-  style="background:#cfc;"
| 1989-06-06 || Win ||align=left| Prasert Kittikasem || 1st IMF World Championships|| Anaheim, California, United States || Decision (unanimous) || 5 || 3:00
|-
! style=background:white colspan=9 |

|-  style="background:#c5d2ea;"
| 1988-09-10|| Draw||align=left| Sagat Petchyindee|| || Anaheim, California, United States || Decision (split) || 5 ||3:00

|-  style="background:#cfc;"
| 1988-08-15 || Win ||align=left| || || Tijuana, Mexico || ||  ||

|-  style="background:#cfc;"
| 1987- || Win ||align=left| Ken Ahate|| || Yuma, Arizona, United States || ||  ||

|-  style="background:#fbb;"
| 1986-11-24|| Loss||align=left| Richard Sylla || || Paris, France || Decision || 12 || 2:00 
|-
! style=background:white colspan=9 |

|-  style="background:#cfc;"
| 1986-11-01|| Win ||align=left| Okubo|| || Yuma, Arizona, United States || ||  ||

|-  style="background:#cfc;"
| 1986-10-25|| Win ||align=left| Lance Lewis|| || London, England || Decision || 7 || 2:00

|-  style="background:#cfc;"
| 1986-06-28|| Win ||align=left| Pat Romero|| || Reno, Nevada, United States || Decision || 12 || 2:00 
|-
! style=background:white colspan=9 |

|-  style="background:#cfc;"
| 1986-05-23|| Win ||align=left| Yohan Kim|| || San Jose, California, United States || ||  ||

|-  style="background:#cfc;"
| 1986-02-28|| Win ||align=left| Phil Holdridge || || Hollywood, California, United States || KO (body shot)|| 3 || 1:29 
|-
! style=background:white colspan=9 |

|-  style="background:#cfc;"
| 1985-11-15 || Win ||align=left| Jeff Ortzow ||  || Tijuana, Mexico || ||  ||

|-  style="background:#cfc;"
| 1985-10-04 || Win ||align=left| Angel Gutierez ||  || Tijuana, Mexico || ||  ||

|-  style="background:#cfc;"
| 1985-04-06 || Win ||align=left| Robert Visitacion||  || Northridge, California, United States || ||  ||

|-  style="background:#cfc;"
| 1984-10-13 || Win ||align=left| Matt Moncayo||  || Los Angeles, California United States || ||  ||

|-  style="background:#cfc;"
| 1984-07-27 || Win ||align=left| Khaosod Sitpraprom ||  || Los Angeles, California, United States || Decision (unanimous) || 5 || 3:00

|-  style="background:#cfc;"
| 1984-06-01 || Win ||align=left| Charlie Gallegos||  || Edmonton, Canada || ||  ||

|-  style="background:#cfc;"
| 1984-03-24 || Win ||align=left| Tom Larouche||  || Vancouver, Canada || ||  ||

|-  style="background:#cfc;"
| 1984-02-24|| Win ||align=left| Janrob Muangsurin || || Hollywood, California, United States || KO (high kick)||  ||

|-  style="background:#cfc;"
| 1983-07-01 || Win ||align=left| Dave Johnston ||  || United States|| ||  ||

|-  style="background:#cfc;"
| 1982-09-06 || Win ||align=left| Rod Kei||  || Edmonton, Canada || ||  ||

|-  style="background:#cfc;"
| 1982-06-21|| Win ||align=left| Gordy Gong|| ||   || ||  ||

|-  style="background:#cfc;"
| 1982-03-08|| Win ||align=left| Fred Peraldo|| || Edmonton, Canada  || ||  ||

|-  style="background:#cfc;"
| 1981-08-10 || Win ||align=left| Juan Torres ||  || Trail, British Columbia, Canada || ||  ||

|-  style="background:#cfc;"
| 1981-03-01|| Win ||align=left| Robillard|| || Edmonton, Canada  || ||  ||

|-  style="background:#cfc;"
| 1981-02-01|| Win ||align=left| Gordy Gong|| ||  Vancouver, Canada || TKO (doctor stoppage)|| 3 ||   
|-
! style=background:white colspan=9 |
|-
| colspan=9 | Legend:

See also 
 List of male kickboxers

External links 
 
 
 Video Highlights
 Peter Sugarfoot Cunningham Facebook Fan Page

References 

Living people
1963 births
Canadian male kickboxers
Lightweight kickboxers
Welterweight kickboxers
Sportspeople from Edmonton
Canadian male karateka
Chitō-ryū practitioners
American Kenpo practitioners
Sportspeople from Port of Spain
Black Canadian boxers
Canadian male boxers
Trinidad and Tobago emigrants to Canada
Trinidad and Tobago male kickboxers